The 1962 Air Force Falcons football team represented the United States Air Force Academy as an independent during the 1962 NCAA University Division football season. They were led by fifth-year head coach Ben Martin, and played their home games at the new Falcon Stadium in Colorado Springs, Colorado, opening with a 34–0 win over Colorado State. The Falcons compiled a record 5–5 and outscored their opponents 173–171.

The $3.5 million stadium was formally dedicated on October 20 against Oregon, which included a flyover by the Thunderbirds. This was during the early stages of the Cuban Missile Crisis, which was disclosed to the nation by President John F. Kennedy two days later on Monday.

Schedule

Personnel

References

Air Force
Air Force Falcons football seasons
Air Force Falcons football